Mitong may refer to:

Mitong River (Assam)
Mitong River (Equatorial Guinea)